Morgans can refer to:
 Morgans (surname), people with the surname
Morgans, alternative rendering of Mokens or Morgan sea gypsies
 Morgans, alternative rendering of Morgens, Welsh water sprites
 Morgan's, defunct Canadian department store chain